Nateva Music & Camping Festival was a four-day, multi stage, limited capacity outdoor camping festival held July 1–4, 2010 at the 100+ acre Oxford Fairgrounds in Oxford, Maine. The festival featured headliners moe., The Flaming Lips, and Furthur. Lotus headlined "early bird" activities on Thursday, July 1.

July 1

Port City Music Hall Stage:
 Lotus
 Lettuce
 Gypsy Tailwind

July 2

Main Stage 1:
 moe.
 Passion Pit
 Jakob Dylan and Three Legs
 Umphrey's McGee
 Greensky Bluegrass

Main Stage 2:
 Ghostland Observatory
 Jackie Greene
 Keller Williams
 The Felice Brothers
 Magic Magic

Port City Music Hall Stage:
 Big Gigantic (Late Night)
 The Felice Brothers (Late Night)
 The Heavy Pets
 The Problemaddicts
 Adam Ezra Group
 Bow Thayer and Perfect Trainwreck
 The Mallet Brothers

Barn Stage:
 Ryan Montbleau Band (Late Night)
 Yellow Roman Candles (acoustic intermission)

July 3

Main Stage 1:
 The Flaming Lips
 Grizzly Bear
 Drive-By Truckers
 John Brown's Body
 Rustic Overtones
 Magic Magic

Main Stage 2:
 Sound Tribe Sector 9
 She & Him
 Crash Kings
 Ryan Montbleau Band
 Brenda

Port City Music Hall Stage:
 EOTO (Late Night)
 Giant Panda Guerilla Dub Squad (Late Night)
 The Indobox
 The Brew
 The McLovins
 Roots of Creation
 Grand Hotel

Barn Stage:
 Toubab Krewe (Late Night)
 The Kind Buds (Late Night)

July 4

Main Stage 1:
 Furthur with Phil Lesh & Bob Weir
 George Clinton & P-Funk
 Max Creek
 Mark Karan's Jerimah Puddleduck

Main Stage 2:
 Derek Trucks & Susan Tedeschi Band
 Zappa Plays Zappa
 Moonalice
 You Can Be A Wesley

Port City Music Hall Stage:
 Nephrock! Allstars
 The Constellations
 Alchemystics
 Nate Wilson Group
 Billy Keane and the Misdemeanor Outlaws
 Mudseason

External links
 Official Nateva Music & Camping Festival website

Music festivals in Maine
Tourist attractions in Oxford County, Maine
Oxford, Maine
2010 in Maine